Signal Peak is the highest point in the San Joaquin Hills area  of Orange County, California, United States. The peak is visible in the southern sky in most of north Orange County, and from far southern Los Angeles County. Signal Peak overlooks the University of California, Irvine, to the north and Crystal Cove State Park to the south and southeast. It is the first and highest peak that one encounters traveling southbound on State Route 73. It is a major two-way radio site for Orange County.

Signal Peak also serves as a visual reporting checkpoint for incoming private aircraft from the south, inbound to land at John Wayne Airport.

References

External links
 

Mountains of Orange County, California
Mountains of Southern California